Dzerzhinsky was a  of the Soviet Navy.

Development and design 

The Sverdlov-class cruisers, Soviet designation Project 68bis, were the last conventional gun cruisers built for the Soviet Navy. They were built in the 1950s and were based on Soviet, German, and Italian designs and concepts developed prior to the Second World War. They were modified to improve their sea keeping capabilities, allowing them to run at high speed in the rough waters of the North Atlantic. The basic hull was more modern and had better armor protection than the vast majority of the post Second World War gun cruiser designs built and deployed by peer nations. They also carried an extensive suite of modern radar equipment and anti-aircraft artillery. The Soviets originally planned to build 40 ships in the class, which would be supported by the s and aircraft carriers.

The Sverdlov class displaced 13,600 tons standard and 16,640 tons at full load. They were  long overall and  long at the waterline. They had a beam of  and draught of  and typically had a complement of 1,250. The hull was a completely welded new design and the ships had a double bottom for over 75% of their length. The ship also had twenty-three watertight bulkheads. The Sverdlovs had six boilers providing steam to two shaft geared steam turbines generating . This gave the ships a maximum speed of . The cruisers had a range of  at .

Sverdlov-class cruisers main armament included twelve /57 cal B-38 guns mounted in four triple Mk5-bis turrets. They also had twelve /56 cal Model 1934 guns in six twin SM-5-1 mounts. For anti-aircraft weaponry, the cruisers had thirty-two  anti-aircraft guns in sixteen twin mounts and were also equipped with ten  torpedo tubes in two mountings of five each.

The Sverdlovs had   belt armor and had a   armored deck. The turrets were shielded by  armor and the conning tower, by  armor.

The cruisers' ultimate radar suite included one 'Big Net' or 'Top Trough' air search radar, one 'High Sieve' or 'Low Sieve' air search radar, one 'Knife Rest' air search radar and one 'Slim Net' air search radar. For navigational radar they had one 'Don-2' or 'Neptune' model. For fire control purposes the ships were equipped with two 'Sun Visor' radars, two 'Top Bow' 152 mm gun radars and eight 'Egg Cup' gun radars. For electronic countermeasures the ships were equipped with two 'Watch Dog' ECM systems.

Construction and career
The ship was built at Admiralty Shipyard in Leningrad and was launched on 31 August 1950 and commissioned on 18 August 1952.

On 30 August 1952, she became a member of the Red Banner Black Sea Fleet. By the end of 1955, on the basis of the pre-design study, the design bureau determined the optimal option: the placement of the M-2 anti-aircraft missile system launcher in the place of the removable main-caliber rear tower (number 3) with the simultaneous rearrangement of the shell cellar of this tower for the missile storage. The changes in the ship were confirmed by the necessary stability and unsinkability calculations. In February 1956, the Commander-in-Chief of the Navy approved the TT assignment for the 70E project. From 15 October 1957 to 24 December 1958, she was modernized and rebuilt at Sevmorzavod in Sevastopol according to the Project 70E. Chief designer of the project K. I. Troshkov. In the process of re-equipment on the ship, the following were removed: the third tower, the aft rangefinder post, eight 37 mm V-11 guns and torpedo armament. Instead, they installed: one experimental M-2 air defense system with a stabilized SM-64 launcher, a cellar for 10 V-753 missiles, a Corvette control system and a Kaktus and Razliv radar.

On 3 August 1961, she was reclassified as a training ship. From 20 to 26 August 1964, she visited to Constanța.

In April 1967, visited to Split. From 10 to 14 July, she visited to Port Said. From 5 to 30 June 1967 and from 5 to 24 October 1973, while in the war zone, she carried out a combat mission to provide assistance to the Egyptian Armed Forces (Six-Day War and Yom Kippur War).

From 9 to 12 August 1969, she visited to Varna. In October 1969, she visited to Alexandria. From 26 to 30 April 1971, she visited to Le Havre. From 14 to 18 December 1971, she visited to Latakia.

In March 1976, she visited to Tartus and in April 1976, she visited to Split. From 30 June to 4 July 1977, she visited to Tunisia. From 20 to 25 October 1978, she visited to Piraeus. From 16 to 20 November 1978, she visited to Istanbul.

On 19 February 1980, she was decommissioned from the Navy, mothballed and put on hold in Sevastopol. On 12 October 1988, she was disarmed and stricken from the Navy. On 9 December 1988, her crew was disbanded and transferred to OFI for dismantling and implementation.

Pennant numbers

See also 
List of ships of the Soviet Navy
List of ships of Russia by project number

References

Ships built at the Black Sea Shipyard
Sverdlov-class cruisers
Cold War cruisers of the Soviet Union
1952 ships